Liberty Corners is a neighborhood in the village of Salem Lakes in south-central Kenosha County, Wisconsin, United States. It is centered at the intersection of Highway 83 and Wilmot Road (Kenosha County Highway C).

Notes

Neighborhoods in Wisconsin